Nanae (written: , , ,  or  in hiragana) is a feminine Japanese given name. Notable people with the name include:

, Japanese writer
, Japanese manga artist
, Japanese guitarist
, Japanese manga artist
, Japanese voice actress
, Japanese long-distance runner
, Japanese manga artist
, Japanese professional boxer 
, Japanese professional wrestler
, Japanese volleyball player
, Japanese fencer

Fictional characters
, a character in the anime series Sky Girls
, a character in the anime series Super Doll Licca-chan

Japanese feminine given names